Ryang Chun-hwa (born 12 June 1991 in Pyongyang) is a North Korean weighlifter. She competed at the 2012 Summer Olympics in the Women's 48 kg, winning the bronze medal. Ryang represents the April 25 Sports Team. She won the silver medal at the 2011 Summer Universiade.

Major results

References

North Korean female weightlifters
1991 births
Living people
World Weightlifting Championships medalists
Sportspeople from Pyongyang
Olympic weightlifters of North Korea
Weightlifters at the 2012 Summer Olympics
Olympic bronze medalists for North Korea
Olympic medalists in weightlifting
Medalists at the 2012 Summer Olympics
Universiade medalists in weightlifting
Universiade silver medalists for North Korea
Medalists at the 2011 Summer Universiade
21st-century North Korean women